Jaquan Johnson (born November 13, 1995) is an American football safety who plays for the Las Vegas Raiders. He played college football at Miami. He was drafted by the Buffalo Bills in the 6th round of the 2019 NFL Draft.

High school career 
Johnson played on both sides of the ball at Miami Killian High School, playing defensive back and running back. He earned an invitation to the U. S. Army All-American Bowl after his senior season, and caught 13 interceptions throughout his high school career. Johnson committed to the University of Miami on August 19, 2014, flipping from previous frontrunner Florida State, which was his choice as late as two weeks before the commitment.

College career 
Stuck behind upperclassmen, Johnson was a reserve his first two years of college.

During his junior year, Johnson led the Hurricanes with 96 tackles. Late in the season, defensive coordinator Manny Diaz called him the "heart and soul" of the Hurricanes' defense. Johnson also made program history by becoming the first player to earn three consecutive ACC Defensive Back of the Week awards, winning the accolade in the tenth, eleventh and twelfth weeks of the season. After the season, the team named him its MVP.

He decided to return to Miami for his senior year, and even tried to persuade R. J. McIntosh and Kendrick Norton to stay, albeit unsuccessfully. Johnson cited getting his degree as a large factor in returning for his last season.

After his senior season, Johnson was named second-team All-ACC.

Professional career

Buffalo Bills
Johnson was drafted by the Buffalo Bills in the sixth round with the 181st overall pick in the 2019 NFL Draft. As a rookie, he appeared in 13 games in the regular season and had three total tackles. In Week 16 of the 2020 season, he recorded a 13-yard pass to Siran Neal in the 38–9 victory over the New England Patriots.

Personal life 
Johnson grew up as the middle child of seven in his family and struggled with poverty and hunger as a child, eventually moving into the house of a former flag football coach. He is a cousin of NFL running back Lamar Miller.

References

External links 
Buffalo Bills bio
Miami Hurricanes bio

1995 births
Living people
Players of American football from Miami
Miami Killian Senior High School alumni
American football safeties
Miami Hurricanes football players
Buffalo Bills players